Thermal Power Station railway station is  located in Muzaffargarh Punjab, Pakistan. This railway station is facilitating Thermal Power Station Muzaffargarh.

See also
 List of railway stations in Muzaffargarh
 List of railway stations in Pakistan
 Pakistan Railways

References

External links

Muzaffargarh
Transport in Muzaffargarh
Railway stations in Muzaffargarh District
Railway stations in Pakistan